Loasaceae is a family of 15–20 genera and about 200–260 species of flowering plants in the order Cornales, native to the Americas and Africa. Members of the family include annual, biennial and perennial herbaceous plants, and a few shrubs and small trees. Members of the subfamily Loasoideae are known to exhibit rapid thigmonastic stamen movement when pollinators are present.

Taxonomy 
In the classification system of Dahlgren the Loasaceae were placed in the order Loasales in the superorder Loasiflorae (also called Loasanae). The Angiosperm Phylogeny Group system places them in the related order Cornales in the asterid clade.

Subdivision 
Genera include:
Aosa Weigend (sometimes included in Loasa)
Blumenbachia Schrad.
Caiophora C. Presl
Cevallia Lag.
Chichicaste Weigend (sometimes included in Aosa)
Eucnide Zucc.
Fuertesia Urb.
Grausa Weigend & R.H.Acuña
Gronovia L.
Huidobria Gay (sometimes included in Loasa)
Kissenia R. Br. ex Endl.
Klaprothia Kunth
Loasa Adans.
Mentzelia L.
Nasa Weigend (sometimes included in Loasa)
Petalonyx A. Gray
Plakothira Florence
Presliophytum (Urb. & Gilg) Weigend (sometimes included in Loasa)
Schismocarpus S. F. Blake
Scyphanthus Sweet
Xylopodia Weigend

References

External links 
Germplasm Resources Information Network: Loasaceae
Chilean Loasaceae in Chileflora, seed provider 
Loasaceae in BoDD – Botanical Dermatology Database

 
Asterid families